Aujeszky's disease, usually called pseudorabies in the United States, is a viral disease in swine that has been endemic in most parts of the world. It is caused by Suid herpesvirus 1 (SuHV-1). Aujeszky's disease is considered to be the most economically important viral disease of swine in areas where classical swine fever (hog cholera) has been eradicated. Other mammals, such as cattle, sheep, goats, cats, dogs, and raccoons, are also susceptible. The disease is usually fatal in these animal species.

Research on SuHV-1 in pigs has pioneered animal disease control with genetically modified vaccines. SuHV-1 is now used in model studies of basic processes during lytic herpesvirus infection, and for unravelling molecular mechanisms of herpesvirus neurotropism.

History 
In 1902, a Hungarian veterinarian, Aladár Aujeszky, demonstrated a new infectious agent in a dog, ox, and cat, and showed it caused the same disease in swine and rabbits. In the following decades the infection was found in several European countries, especially in cattle, where local intense pruritus (itching) is a characteristic symptom. And in the United States a well known disease in cattle called "mad itch" was concluded to be in fact Aujeszky's disease.

Disease overview 

The virus is shed in the saliva and nasal secretions of swine infected by the respiratory route. Aerosolization of the virus and transmission by fomites also may occur. The virus may potentially survive for seven hours in humid air, and it may survive on well water for up to seven hours, in green grass, soil, and feces for up to two days, in contaminated feed for up to three days, and in straw bedding for up to four days.

Diagnosis is made mainly by virus isolation in tissue cultures, or through ELISA or PCR tests. Vaccines are available for swine (ATCvet codes:  inactivated,  live, plus various combinations). The infection has been eradicated in a number of European countries. In the United States, the domestic swine population in 2004 was declared free of Aujeszky's disease, though the infection still remains in feral pig populations.

Clinical signs 
Respiratory infection is usually asymptomatic in pigs more than two months old, but it can cause abortion, high mortality in piglets, and coughing, sneezing, fever, constipation, depression, seizures, ataxia, circling, and excess salivation in piglets and mature pigs. Mortality in piglets less than one month of age is close to 100%, but it is less than 10% in pigs between one and six months of age. Pregnant swine can reabsorb their litters or deliver mummified, stillborn, or weakened piglets. In cattle, symptoms include intense itching followed by neurological signs and death. In dogs, symptoms include intense itching, jaw and pharyngeal paralysis, howling, and death. Any infected secondary host generally only lives two to three days.

Genital infection appears to have been common in a great part of the 20th century in many European countries in swine herds, where boars from boar centres were used for natural service of sows or gilts. This disease manifestation has always been asymptomatic in affected pigs, and presence of the infection on a farm was detected only because of cases in cattle showing pruritus on the hindquarters.

In susceptible animals other than swine, infection is usually fatal, and the affected animals most often show intense pruritus in a skin area. Pruritus in Aujeszky's disease is considered a phantom sensation as virus has never been found at the site of pruritus.

Pathogenicity and virulence of SuHV-1 

The epidemiology of Aujeszky's disease varies with the pathogenicity or virulence of the virus strain involved. This is best illustrated by the development of the severity of the disease in Denmark, where import of swine had been forbidden for decades up to 1972. Before 1964 only genital strains were spread, but then respiratory strains appeared, which subsequently were spread rapidly over the country, mainly by the trade of animals. In the late 1970s more virulent strains developed. The disease in swine became much more severe, outbreaks of respiratory disease in cattle rose dramatically, and the infection was spread airborne to other swine herds. The higher virulence of these virus strains was associated with a certain ability to create syncytia (cell fusion) in tissue cultures (syncytial virus strains). Comprehensive restriction fragment pattern analyses of virus DNA have documented that the more virulent strains had not been introduced from abroad but had developed in two steps from the original Danish strains. The correlation between high virulence of virus strains and syncytium formation in tissue cultures was confirmed by examinations of isolates from other countries. This second step in the severity development of the disease in Denmark caused the decision to eradicate. New outbreaks after the eradication of the indigenous infection by the end of 1985 were all caused by foreign highly virulent, syncytial strains introduced by airborne transmission from Germany.

Briefly, SuHV-1 is spread either genitally or respiratorily. Genital strains have been found to be non-syncytial. Respiratory strains may be of relatively low or of high virulence. In Europe, syncytial strains have been found to be highly virulent.

Epidemiology 
Populations of wild boar, or feral hogs (Sus scrofa), in the US commonly contract and spread the virus throughout their range. Mortality is highest in young piglets. Pregnant sows often abort when infected. Otherwise healthy male adults (boars) are typically latent carriers, that is, they harbor and transmit the virus without displaying signs or experiencing disability.

Swine (both domestic and feral) are usual reservoirs for this virus, though it does affect other species. Aujeszky's disease has been reported in other mammals, including brown bears, and black bears, Florida panthers, raccoons, coyotes, and whitetail deer. In most cases, contact with pigs or pig products was either known or suspected. Outbreaks in farm fur species in Europe (mink and foxes) have been associated with feeding contaminated pig products. Many other species can be experimentally infected. Humans are not potential hosts.

Cattle have been found to be infected either by the respiratory or the vaginal route (iatrogenic cases disregarded). Primary infection of mucous membranes of the upper respiratory tract is associated with head pruritus, while lung infection results in chest pruritus. Vaginal infection of bovines, which regularly show pruritus of the hindquarters, has been found to be associated with a concurrent genital infection in swine on the same premises, and investigations have evidenced that the vaginal infection of cattle had been sexually transmitted by man from infected sows. Genital infection in swine herds has been closely correlated with the use of boars from boar centres for natural service of sows.

Transmission 
Aujeszky's disease is highly contagious. The infection is commonly considered to be transmitted among swine through nose-to-nose contact, because the virus is mostly present in nasal and oral areas. This notion, however, is contradicted by results from epidemiological studies, according to which the decisive spread within herds occurs by air currents over many meters. Correspondingly, the risk of airborne transmission of highly virulent virus strains from acutely infected herds to other swine herds has been found to be very high. The infection has been found transmitted over distances of many kilometers.
Otherwise, the infection is most often transmitted into herds by introduction of acutely or latently infected pigs.
Concerning transmission to cattle, see section above.

Prevention 
Although no specific treatment for acute infection with SuHV-1 is available, vaccination can alleviate clinical signs in pigs of certain ages. Typically, mass vaccination of all pigs on the farm with a modified live virus vaccine is recommended. Intranasal vaccination of sows and neonatal piglets one to seven days old, followed by intramuscular (IM) vaccination of all other swine on the premises, helps reduce viral shedding and improve survival. The modified live virus replicates at the site of injection and in regional lymph nodes. Vaccine virus is shed in such low levels, mucous transmission to other animals is minimal. In gene-deleted vaccines, the thymidine kinase gene has also been deleted; thus, the virus cannot infect and replicate in neurons. Breeding herds are recommended to be vaccinated quarterly, and finisher pigs should be vaccinated after levels of maternal antibody decrease. Regular vaccination results in excellent control of the disease. Concurrent antibiotic therapy via feed and IM injection is recommended for controlling secondary bacterial pathogens.

Applications in neuroscience 
SuHV-1 can be used to analyze neural circuits in the central nervous system (CNS). For this purpose the attenuated (less virulent) Bartha SuHV-1 strain is commonly used and is employed as a retrograde and anterograde transneuronal tracer. In the retrograde direction, SuHV-1-Bartha is transported to a neuronal cell body via its axon, where it is replicated and dispersed throughout the cytoplasm and the dendritic tree. SuHV-1-Bartha released at the synapse is able to cross the synapse to infect the axon terminals of synaptically connected neurons, thereby propagating the virus; however, the extent to which non-synaptic transneuronal transport may also occur is uncertain. Using temporal studies and/or genetically engineered strains of SuHV-1-Bartha, second, third, and higher order neurons may be identified in the neural network of interest.

See also 

 Animal viruses
 Virology

References

External links 

 Overview of the virus and its applications in neuroscience
 Animal viruses

Swine diseases
Dog diseases
Animal viral diseases
Herpesviridae